Modjieb Jamali (Dari: مجيب جمالي; born 30 April 1991) is an Afghan footballer who plays as a midfielder or right-back.

Club career
Jamali played with Romanian side Metalul Reșița. In January 2017 he signed with Montenegrin side FK Dečić.

International career
Jamali was called up for Afghanistan for the World Cup 2018 Qualifying games against Japan and Singapore. He made his debut for Afghanistan against Japan.

References

External links
 
 

1991 births
Living people
Afghan footballers
German footballers
Footballers from Kabul
Afghan emigrants to Germany
Afghanistan international footballers
Association football midfielders
Association football fullbacks
Regionalliga players
Liga II players
Montenegrin First League players
Tercera División players
CS Sportul Snagov players
FK Dečić players
CE Constància players
Afghan expatriate footballers
Afghan expatriate sportspeople in Germany
Expatriate footballers in Germany
Afghan expatriate sportspeople in Romania
Expatriate footballers in Romania
Afghan expatriate sportspeople in Montenegro
Expatriate footballers in Montenegro
Afghan expatriate sportspeople in Spain
Expatriate footballers in Spain